Shippingport is a borough in western Beaver County, Pennsylvania, United States, located along the Ohio River. The population was 159 at the 2020 census.  It is part of the Pittsburgh metropolitan area. Shippingport is home to the Beaver Valley Nuclear Power Station, and formerly the Bruce Mansfield Power Plant and Shippingport Atomic Power Station, the world's first full-scale atomic electric power plant devoted exclusively to peacetime uses.

Nuclear energy

Shippingport is the site of the United States' first commercial nuclear power plant, the Shippingport Atomic Power Station, which began operation in 1957. Although the original Shippingport reactor was decommissioned in 1982, the Beaver Valley Nuclear Power Station Units 1 and 2 from the same site have been in operation since 1976 and 1987, respectively.

Geography
Shippingport is located in west-central Beaver County at  (40.623594, -80.424691), on the south side of the Ohio River. It is bordered to the southwest by Greene Township and to the southeast by Raccoon Township. To the north, across the Ohio River, are the boroughs of Industry (north) and Midland (northwest). The Shippingport Bridge carries Pennsylvania Route 168 across the river into Industry.

Demographics

As of the census of 2000, there were 237 people, 89 households, and 63 families residing in the borough. The population density was 72.2 people per square mile (27.9/km²). There were 95 housing units at an average density of 29.0 per square mile (11.2/km²). The racial makeup of the borough was 100.00% White.

There were 89 households, out of which 32.6% had children under the age of 18 living with them, 55.1% were married couples living together, 13.5% had a female householder with no husband present, and 29.2% were non-families. 25.8% of all households were made up of individuals, and 11.2% had someone living alone who was 65 years of age or older. The average household size was 2.66 and the average family size was 3.21.

In the borough the population was spread out, with 27.8% under the age of 18, 8.0% from 18 to 24, 28.3% from 25 to 44, 19.8% from 45 to 64, and 16.0% who were 65 years of age or older. The median age was 33 years. For every 100 females, there were 89.6 males. For every 100 females age 18 and over, there were 96.6 males.

The median income for a household in the borough was $33,333, and the median income for a family was $34,861. Males had a median income of $27,159 versus $15,938 for females. The per capita income for the borough was $13,759. About 7.0% of families and 7.5% of the population were below the poverty line, including 16.7% of those under the age of eighteen and none of those sixty five or over.

Education
Children in Shippingport are served by the South Side Area School District. The current schools serving Shippingport are:
 South Side Elementary School –  grades K-5
 South Side Middle School – grades 6-8
 South Side High School – grades 9-12

See also
 List of cities and towns along the Ohio River

References

External links
 Borough website

Pennsylvania populated places on the Ohio River
Populated places established in 1910
Pittsburgh metropolitan area
Boroughs in Beaver County, Pennsylvania